Royal Air Force Faldingworth or more simply RAF Faldingworth is a former Royal Air Force station used during and after the Second World War. It was located close to the village of Faldingworth in Lincolnshire, England.

Development
By 1936 the RAF Expansion Scheme had overseen a period of rapid increases both in terms of aircraft operated and the development of new stations. The Faldingworth site was one of several earmarked under the expansion programme.

As it developed, it made an increasingly dramatic imposition on the surrounding rural landscape such as to the Lincolnshire Edge, a Jurassic limestone ridge, which forms the distinctive backbone of the county from Whitton on the Humber Estuary in the north, down to Grantham in the south.

It provides a continuous homogenous landscape of high quality agricultural land, with a number of local variations. To the west of the Edge, the gently undulating Trent Vale eventually flows into the moors and levels of Humberhead, draining to the Humber Estuary.

To the east there is a gentle transition into the Central Lincolnshire Vale between the Humber and Lincoln, while south of Lincoln the Edge is bounded by a narrow finger of Fenland, which follows the River Witham into Lincoln. To the south, the Edge merges into the more undulating Kesteven Uplands.

Along the top of the Edge a series of airfields were developed. They lie within an open landscape, consisting of rectilinear fields and few boundaries.

History
Faldingworth entered service life as Toft Grange decoy airfield and later as a satellite airfield of RAF Lindholme. Late in 1943 it became a satellite of RAF Ludford Magna. After the war the base was used for storage of weapons.

In 1957 the site became a nuclear weapons store for the RAF's V bomber force. In times of crisis nuclear weapons from the site would be distributed to the nearby V-bomber airfields such as RAF Scampton, RAF Finningley and RAF Coningsby. With the transfer of the UK nuclear deterrent role to the Royal Navy's s in 1968 the site was run down and finally deactivated in 1972.

In 1959 there was an oxygen production unit operating on the opposite side of the airfield to the nuclear weapons storage site.  Two BA1D air separation units were operated on a 24-hour basis to provide a ready supply of breathable oxygen for the aircrew of the V-bombers.  At that time RAF Faldingworth was a satellite station of RAF Scampton.

There is a cluster of 127 RAF-built houses northeast of the airfield area, sold to Roger Byron-Collins' Welbeck Estate Group in 1979 and renamed The Virginia Estate. A group of RAF buildings is used as an industrial estate.

Operation units and aircraft
The following units were here at some point:
 No. 300 Polish Bomber Squadron (1944-1947) - Vickers Wellington X, Avro Lancaster I & III
 No. 305 Polish Bomber Squadron (1946-1947) - de Havilland Mosquito VI
 No. 1546 (Beam Approach Training) Flight RAF
 No. 1667 Heavy Conversion Unit RAF
 No. 1 Lancaster Finishing School RAF
 No. 92 Maintenance Unit RAF (No. 92 MU)
 No. 93 MU
 No. 2797 Squadron RAF Regiment

Memorial
A memorial is now in place at the end of the main runway commemorating 300 (Polish) Squadron.

References

Citations

Bibliography

External links

 Subterranean Britain description and photographs
 Airfields & Aviation Memorials

Royal Air Force stations in Lincolnshire
Royal Air Force stations of World War II in the United Kingdom